Eatonina martae is a species of minute sea snail, a marine gastropod mollusk in the family Cingulopsidae.

Description

Distribution

References

Cingulopsidae
Gastropods described in 1993